Joseph Bradford Treat (December 22, 1836December 23, 1919) was an American businessman and Republican politician.  He served as a member of the Wisconsin State Senate, representing Green County, and later served as chairman of the Republican Party of Wisconsin.

Biography
Treat was born on December 22, 1836 in Orono, Maine. His father, Nathaniel Treat, was a member of the Maine House of Representatives and built the Nathaniel Treat House. They were descended from Robert Treat. On January 18, 1859, Treat married Priscilla W. Gould. They had two sons, including Charles Treat, who became a major general in the United States Army. He and his family were Universalists.

In 1860, Treat settled in Monroe, Wisconsin. There, he established a dry-goods business before becoming involved in lumber and banking. He died in 1919 in Monroe.

Political career
Treat was a member of the Senate from 1876 to 1880. He represented the 12th District. Other positions he held include Mayor and member of the school board of Monroe, Chairman of the county board of Green County, Wisconsin, Chairman of the Republican State Central Committee and delegate to the 1900 Republican National Convention.

References

External links
 
The Political Graveyard
Wisconsin Historical Society

People from Orono, Maine
People from Monroe, Wisconsin
Wisconsin state senators
Republican Party of Wisconsin chairs
Mayors of places in Wisconsin
School board members in Wisconsin
American Universalists
Businesspeople from Wisconsin
1836 births
1919 deaths
19th-century American politicians
19th-century American businesspeople